The Holy Cross College of Calinan also referred to by its acronym HCCC is a private Catholic coeducational basic and higher education institution administered by the Sisters of the Presentation of Mary in Calinan, Davao City, Philippines. It was founded by the Society of Foreign Missions (P.M.E.) in June 1948.

History

The college was established by the priests of the Society of Foreign Missions (P.M.E.) in June 1948 as a high school institution. In 1958, the Sisters of the Presentation of Mary, a Catholic religious women's congregation, took over the management of the school from the priests of the Society of Foreign Missions (P.M.E.). With the rapid growth of the school population the Sisters of the Presentation of Mary opened the college department in 1964, and offered the four-year course in Education, Liberal Arts and Commerce with an initial enrolment of 68 students.

In 1967-1968, the first college enrolees were ready to graduate from the four-year course in the college department. There were a total of 37 graduates for that year.

In 1989-1900, the HCCC added Nursing Aide for protection, General Electronics, and Practical Electricity.

Campus

HCCC has two campuses: the Main Campus at Buda National Highway and the Talomo Campus, which is still under construction.

Academics

Colleges
 Business Administration 
 Education
 Liberal Arts

Incident
At the event, a Grade 7 student named Anne Basag later died after suffering a third-degree burn when her costume caught fire while participating in the school’s intramurals last October 25, 2019.

Notable
In 1993, a greener pasture in Japan, Ines Yamanouchi P. Mallari graduated with a BA Major in Arts in English Literature.
In September 2019, A student named Justine Abella has been ranked as 10 September LET exams in Davao City.

References

Educational institutions established in 1948
Catholic elementary schools in the Philippines
1948 establishments in the Philippines